The Deutsches Segelflugmuseum mit Modellflug, situated on the Wasserkuppe in the German state of Hesse is the national gliding museum, opened in 1987.

History
German glider pilots and designers have made many contributions to the development of glider aerodynamics and flight techniques. The Wasserkuppe has been a gliding site since about 1910 and was closely associated with the emergence of gliding as a sport during the interwar period. In particular it hosted the annual series of gliding competitions, started in 1920, that became known as the Rhön contests. Initially national, they became international events.

Because of its long association with the sport, it seemed a natural home for a national gliding museum, an idea conceived in 1970 with the 50th anniversary of the first Rhön contest. The Deutsches Segelflugmuseum mit Modellflug was officially opened in August 1987 in a purpose built hall. By 2014 the collection included more than sixty aircraft, all German, showing their development from Otto Lilienthal's hang gliders through wooden machines to the earliest glassfibre aircraft of the 1960s.  There are also photographic records, focussing on the series of Rhön contests, with aircraft pilots and designers.

The museum has a store for aircraft which are not currently on display and a workshop for restoring them. In 2014 these held some twenty-five aircraft.

Content

List from Bob Ogden, Air Britain News, November 2014.

On display

See also
List of aerospace museums
List of gliders

References

External links

 Photos of the museum's exhibits at AirHistory.net

Aerospace museums in Germany
Gliding in Germany